Linwood Lawn is a historic home located at Lexington, Lafayette County, Missouri.  It was built between 1850 and 1854, and is a two-story, rectangular, Italianate style brick dwelling. It measures 71 feet by 110 feet and features a heavy cornice, detailed balustrades, bay windows, and detailed columns.  Also on the property is a contributing brick, octagonal ice house.

It was listed on the National Register of Historic Places in 1973.

References

Houses on the National Register of Historic Places in Missouri
Italianate architecture in Missouri
Houses completed in 1854
Houses in Lafayette County, Missouri
National Register of Historic Places in Lafayette County, Missouri